The Nectar Covered Bridge was a wood and metal combination style covered bridge which spanned the Locust Fork of the Black Warrior River in Blount County, Alabama, United States.  It was located on Nectar Bridge Road off State Route 160, just east of the town of Nectar, about 14 miles (16 kilometers) northwest of Oneonta.  Nectar Covered Bridge was at one time the seventh-longest covered bridge in the country.  The bridge remained open to single lane motor traffic from its construction until it was burned by vandals on June 13, 1993.

History
Built in 1934, the 385-foot (117-meter) bridge was a Town Lattice truss construction over four spans.  It was built by a crew led by foreman Zelma C. Tidwell over a wide section of the Locust Fork.  It was the third-longest covered bridge built in Blount County.  At one time, the Nectar Covered Bridge was the seventh longest covered bridge in the country.  The bridge was burned by vandals on June 13, 1993.  It was maintained by the Blount County Commission and the Alabama Department of Transportation.  The Nectar Covered Bridge was listed on the National Register of Historic Places on August 20, 1981.

The bridge was once a community meeting place and a site for large baptism ceremonies.  A concrete bridge has since replaced the former covered bridge, but the old stone piers remain across the river south of the current crossing.

See also
List of Alabama covered bridges

References

Further reading

 The Birmingham News (July 17, 1972) news article. Retrieved October 30, 2007.
 Alabama Department of Archives and History. Nectar CB: Credits. Retrieved October 30, 2007.

Bridges completed in 1932
National Register of Historic Places in Blount County, Alabama
Covered bridges on the National Register of Historic Places in Alabama
Wooden bridges in Alabama
Transportation buildings and structures in Blount County, Alabama
Tourist attractions in Blount County, Alabama
Demolished buildings and structures in Alabama
Demolished but still listed on the National Register of Historic Places
Buildings and structures demolished in 1993
Arson in Alabama
Road bridges on the National Register of Historic Places in Alabama
Lattice truss bridges in the United States
Covered bridges in the United States destroyed by arson